Eidsfos Verk was an ironworks  located at Eidsfoss in Vestfold og Telemark county, Norway.

Eidsfos Verk was established in 1697 when the first blast furnace was first put into operation.  The ironwork, which was dependent on hydropower, ore and forest,  was located on the isthmus between Eikeren and the Bergsvannet. It was established and operated by Lieutenant General Caspar Herman Hausmann  (1653–1718)  and later his widow Karen Toller (1662-1742).

In 1785 the works were acquired by merchant Peder von Cappelen (1763-1837). The owners had a seat on Eidsfos Manor (Eidsfos Hovedgård), which was their private residence until 1897.

The ironworks closed in 1873. Among the company's later activities had been production of foundry products, freight wagons and agricultural machinery. In 1979 the Eidsfos Historic Foundation (Stiftelsen Gamle Eidsfos)  was established to preserve the old ironworks community. Parts of the old ironworks have since become incorporated into a museum (Eidsfoss Jernverksmuseum) which is associated with Vestfold Museum (Vestfoldmuseene).

References

Other sources
Joramo, Morten Alexander (1997) Eidsfos (jern)verk 1697-1997  (jubileumsbok. Eidsfoss).

External links
Eidsfoss Jernverksmuseum website
Eidsfos Hovedgård website
Stiftelsen Eidsfos Hovedgård website
Vestfoldmuseene website

1697 establishments in Norway
Metal companies of Norway
Iron and steel mills
Companies based in Vestfold og Telemark
Museums in Vestfold og Telemark
Industry museums in Norway